The South West African 2-8-0 of 1911 was a steam locomotive from the German South West Africa era.

In 1911, eight tender locomotives with a 2-8-0 Consolidation type wheel arrangement were placed in service by the Lüderitzbucht Eisenbahn (Lüderitzbucht Railway) in German South West Africa. After the First World War, the territory came under South African administration and all eight locomotives came onto the roster of the South African Railways. They were not classified or renumbered and were simply referred to as the Eight-Coupled Tenders.

Manufacturer
In 1911, eight Cape gauge tender locomotives with a 2-8-0 Consolidation type wheel arrangement were delivered to the Lüderitzbucht Eisenbahn in German South West Africa. They were built by Orenstein & Koppel between February and April 1911 and numbered in the range from 151 to 158.

Characteristics
These locomotives had larger boilers than the Eight-Coupled Tank locomotives which had been delivered from the same manufacturer between 1907 and 1910, but their cylinders, frames and motion were interchangeable with those of the tank engines. The locomotives were equipped with dust shields over the coupled wheels and valve gear to protect the moving parts from blown sand in the Namib desert.

The tender rode on two four-wheeled bogies. Photographs show that the coal bunker sides of the tenders were raised by fitting a slatted open-top cage made of rectangular steel rods on top of the coal bunker to increase the coal capacity.

Service

Lüderitzbucht Eisenbahn
The locomotives initially entered service on the Lüderitzbucht Eisenbahn or Südbahn, but they eventually mainly served on the Nord-Südbahn or North-South Railway between Windhoek and Keetmanshoop once that line was completed in 1912. As a result of the scarcity of water in the territory, they often ran with an auxiliary water tank wagon coupled behind their tenders.

South African Railways
On 1 April 1922, all railways in the former German colony came under the administration of the South African Railways (SAR). All eight locomotives had survived the First World War to be taken onto the SAR roster. They retained their German colonial era engine numbers and were not classified by the SAR, but were simply referred to as the Eight-Coupled Tenders.

The Eight-Coupled Tenders remained in SAR service in South West Africa into the late 1930s. One was photographed in service on a passenger train at Swakopmund as late as 7 October 1937.

Illustration

References

0890
2-8-0 locomotives
1D locomotives
Orenstein & Koppel locomotives
Cape gauge railway locomotives
Railway locomotives introduced in 1911
1922 in South Africa
Scrapped locomotives